Zubogy is a village in Borsod-Abaúj-Zemplén county, Hungary. It has road connection with Ragály and Felsőkelecsény. The nearest town is Kazincbarcika (20 km). Name of the village has slovak origin.

Church 
There is Romanesque-Gothic church of the Reformed Church from the 12. century.

External links 
 Street map 

www.zubogy.hu

Populated places in Borsod-Abaúj-Zemplén County